Denise Karbon (born 16 August 1980) is a retired World Cup alpine ski racer from South Tyrol, Italy. She competed in the technical events and specialized in giant slalom.

Biography
Born in Brixen, South Tyrol, Karbon made her World Cup debut in 1998 at age 17, while the following year she was Junior World Champion. She won a total of six World Cup giant slaloms: in December 2003 at Alta Badia and five of the first six races in the 2008 season. She obtained ten other podiums for a total of sixteen.

Karbon won a silver medal at the 2003 World Championships in giant slalom, followed by a bronze in 2007 in the same discipline.

In the 2008 season, Karbon won 5 of the 7 giant slalom races (and took third in another) to win the GS season title with 592 points, 113 points ahead of runner-up Elisabeth Görgl. She finished tenth in the overall standings.

At age 33, Karbon retired in March 2014, after the World Cup finals in Lenzerheide.

Personal
Karbon is the niece of Norbert Rier, leader of the Kastelruther Spatzen, and the cousin of fellow alpine ski racer Peter Fill.

World Cup results

Season titles

Season standings

Race podiums
 6 wins – (6 GS)
 16 podiums – (16 GS)

World Championship results

Olympic results

References

External links
 
 
 Denise Karbon.it – personal website – 
 Fischer Skis – athletes – Denise Karbon

1980 births
Italian female alpine skiers
Alpine skiers at the 2002 Winter Olympics
Alpine skiers at the 2006 Winter Olympics
Alpine skiers at the 2010 Winter Olympics
Alpine skiers at the 2014 Winter Olympics
Olympic alpine skiers of Italy
FIS Alpine Ski World Cup champions
Alpine skiers of Fiamme Gialle
Ladin people
Sportspeople from Brixen
Living people